Globia oblonga, the oblong sedge borer, is a moth of the family Noctuidae. The species was first described by Augustus Radcliffe Grote in 1882. It is found in parts of Canada and the United States

The wingspan is 35–50 mm. Adults are on wing from June to September depending on the location. There is one generation per year.

The larvae initially leaf mine and later bore the stems of Typha and Scirpus species below the water line.

This species was formerly in the genus Capsula, but Capsula was renamed Globia because of a naming conflict with a mollusk.

Range
The range of the oblong sedge borer includes Southern Canada, notably the area between British Columbia and the Maritimes, The Gulf of Mexico, and Southern California.

References

External links

Xyleninae
Moths of North America
Moths described in 1882